Seison is a genus of rotifers belonging to the family Seisonidae.

Species:

Seison africanus 
Seison nebaliae

References

Rotifer genera
Pararotatoria